Hussein ("Yussen") José Monsalve Madrid (born 3 March 1969) is a retired male road cyclist from Venezuela. He represented his native country at the 1999 Pan American Games in Winnipeg, Manitoba, Canada, and twice at the Summer Olympics: 1992 and 1996.

Career

1997
1st in Stage 4 part a Vuelta al Táchira (VEN)
1998
1st in Stage 3 Vuelta al Táchira, Tova (VEN)
1st in Stage 10 Vuelta a Venezuela (VEN)
2nd in General Classification Vuelta a Venezuela (VEN)
2001
5th in General Classification Vuelta a Venezuela (VEN)
2002
46th in General Classification Olympic Games, Barcelona 1992

References

External links
 

1969 births
Living people
Venezuelan male cyclists
Cyclists at the 1992 Summer Olympics
Cyclists at the 1996 Summer Olympics
Cyclists at the 1999 Pan American Games
Olympic cyclists of Venezuela
Vuelta a Venezuela stage winners
Place of birth missing (living people)
Pan American Games competitors for Venezuela
20th-century Venezuelan people
21st-century Venezuelan people